

MacGyver TV franchise 
MacGyver is the title character of the series of an American action-adventure television franchise.

Wikipedia has the following relevant articles and lists: 

 List of MacGyver characters
 MacGyver in popular culture, including MacGyverisms and "to MacGyver"

MacGyver (1985 TV series), television series that ran from 1985 to 1992.
 List of MacGyver (1985 TV series) episodes
 MacGyver (1985 TV series, season 1)
 MacGyver (1985 TV series, season 2)
 MacGyver (1985 TV series, season 3)
 MacGyver (1985 TV series, season 4)
 MacGyver (1985 TV series, season 5)
 MacGyver (1985 TV series, season 6)
 MacGyver (1985 TV series, season 7)

MacGyver (2016 TV series), a reboot of the original television series
 List of MacGyver (2016 TV series) episodes
 MacGyver (2016 TV series, season 1)
 MacGyver (2016 TV series, season 2)
 MacGyver (2016 TV series, season 3)
 MacGyver (2016 TV series, season 4)

Other 
MacGyver the Lizard (born 2012), an Argentine red tegu lizard and Internet celebrity

See also 
 McIver